The Farm is the British version of the international TV format The Farm, produced by Strix. The show had a number of celebrities appear on it during its two series run on Five between 2004 and 2005. After the completion of the second series in 2005, Five revealed that they would not be airing any further series of the show.

In 2018, a revamped version of the show titled Celebs on the Farm premiered on 5Star.

Format
In the UK version of The Farm, the show puts a group of celebrities on a farm where they live together for a short period of time. On the farm, the contestants must do typical farmer work involving agriculture and animal rearing. At regular intervals, one of the contestants is evicted from the farm by way of a public telephone vote. This process is continued until only one contestant remains, and then they gain the title of "Top Farmer".

Series 1 (2004)
Series one was announced in the summer of 2004, and eventually went to air from 26 September 2004, presented and narrated by Ed Hall. The show's first series broadcast in a nightly 10pm slot from 26 September to 17 October 2004.

The show's first series caused plenty of controversy for Five when in October 2004 it showed Rebecca Loos masturbating a pig and collecting a semen sample from it. This incident among others also caused outrage from the RSPCA.

The winner of the show by viewers' votes was Jeff Brazier.

The celebrities that took part were:

Series 2 (2005)

Series two was announced soon after the completion of the first series. The second series aired from 9 May 2005 for a total of eighteen days, and was now presented by Colin McAllister and Justin Ryan. The show's second and final series was broadcast in a nightly 10.30pm slot (half-an-hour later than the timeslot during the first series) between 9 May and 26 May 2005.

The winner of the show by viewer's votes was Keith Harris and Orville the Duck.

The celebrities that took part were:

Ratings
The show's first episode managed 1.16 million viewers for Five, and overall, the first series was a success for the Channel, managing an average of 1.4 million viewers in its 10pm nightly timeslot. The first series received an increase in viewers thanks to the incident involving Rebecca Loos, and for the series one finale scored a peak of nearly 2.3 million viewers, and a 15.2% audience share for Five.

The show's second series began in May 2005 with a new nightly timeslot of 10.30pm, with the first episode taking 1.17 million viewers and a 9.2% audience share. The second series did not rate as well as the first however, and overall managed an average of 1.19 million viewers in its timeslot.

References

2004 British television series debuts
2005 British television series endings
2000s British reality television series
British television series based on non-British television series
Channel 5 (British TV channel) reality television shows
The Farm (franchise)
Television shows set on farms